Bachelor Girl are an Australian pop duo, formed in 1992 by Tania Doko as vocalist and James Roche as musician, producer and arranger. Their 1998 debut single, "Buses and Trains", was a top-10 hit in Australia and New Zealand; it peaked in the top 30 in Sweden and charted in the UK. The follow up single, "Treat Me Good", reached the top 40 in Australia and New Zealand. Their debut studio album, Waiting for the Day, was released in 1998 and reached the top 20 on the ARIA Albums Chart and achieved platinum certification. Worldwide, Bachelor Girl has sold a total of more than 500,000 albums and singles.

History

1992–1997: Formation
Bachelor Girl formed in December 1992 when songwriter and record producer, James Roche, met vocalist Tania Doko. Roche had previously worked, on keyboards or producing, with Tommy Emmanuel, John Farnham and Jack Jones (aka Irwin Thomas). Doko was a classically trained university student. Roche was crafting a demonstration tape of a song he had written for an Australian girl group, Girlfriend, and when the original singer cancelled, he recruited Doko. They began writing songs and recording other demos together. In December 1997, Bachelor Girl signed with Gotham Records, distributed by BMG, after being rejected by Sony.

1998–2001: Waiting for the Day
Bachelor Girl's debut single, "Buses and Trains", was released on 18 June 1998. The song peaked at No. 4 on the ARIA Singles Chart and No. 6 on the New Zealand Singles Chart. In 1999, it appeared in the top 30 on the Swedish Singles Chart and reached the top 100 in the UK. Their second single, "Treat Me Good", was issued in November 1998 and reached the top 40 in Australia and New Zealand. The related album, Waiting for the Day, was released in November and peaked at No. 20 on the ARIA Albums Chart. In May 1999, their third single, "Lucky Me" reached the top 50 in Australia and New Zealand. It reached the top 20 on the Finnish Singles Chart. In August, the album was issued internationally as Breaking Through from Down Under on Arista Records.

2002–2004: Dysfunctional and split
In July 2002, Bachelor Girl released "I'm Just A Girl" as the lead single from their forthcoming second studio album. The song reached the Australian top 30. Their second album, Dysfunctional, was released in August and peaked in the top 30. "Drowning Not Waving" was released in October 2002 as the second and final single from the album.

The band recorded their third studio album in 2003-2004 but was never released as the duo amicably split in 2004.

2004–2017: Hiatus, Loved & Lost: The Best of Bachelor Girl and Beautifully Wrong – The Lost Songs
In April 2011, a compilation album, Loved & Lost: The Best of Bachelor Girl, was released by Sony Music Australia. It featured four tracks abandoned from the third studio album. Doko stated in interviews that the band did not feel there was enough material from their two albums to fill a greatest hits album, and they decided to use cuts from the unreleased third studio album. In May and June, Bachelor Girl performed three gigs to promote the album. In August 2011, the previously unreleased third album was released digitally, titled Beautifully Wrong – The Lost Songs.

In 2012, Doko moved to Sweden where she worked as a singer/songwriter and vocal coach. Roche worked with a number of Australian musicians, including producing Anthony Callea's number one album, Backbone in 2016.

2017–present: Reformation, "Speak" & "Calling Out Your Name"
In mid-2017, Roche completed a three-week trip to Stockholm, Sweden, where he met up with Doko. The duo wrote and recorded with various Swedish writers and producers. Roche said, "I had a fantastic time; the context there of musical creation and endeavour is inspiring and energising. I've returned with a collection of songs I am so excited about - I can't wait to complete the production on them!". New material is set for release in 2018. "Speak" was released on 18 June 2018, exactly 20 years since the release of "Buses and Trains".

In February 2023, Bachelor Girl released "Calling Out Your Name".

Discography

Albums

Compilations

Singles

Other appearances

Awards and nominations

ARIA Awards
The ARIA Music Awards is an annual awards ceremony that recognises excellence, innovation, and achievement across all genres of Australian music. Bachelor Girl have won 1 award from 5 nominations.

|-
| 1998
| rowspan="2"| "Buses and Trains"
| Best New Talent
| 
|-
| rowspan="4"| 1999
| ARIA Award for Highest Selling Single
| 
|-
| rowspan="2"| Waiting for the Day
| Breakthrough Artist - Album
| 
|-
| Best Pop Release
| 
|-
| Bachelor Girl for Waiting for the Day
| Producer of the Year
| 
|}

APRA Awards
The APRA Awards are held in Australia and New Zealand by the Australasian Performing Right Association to recognise songwriting skills, sales and airplay performance by its members annually. Bachelor Girls have been nominated for three awards.

|-
| rowspan="2"| 1999
| rowspan="2"| "Buses and Trains"
| Song of the Year
| 
|-
| Most Performed Australian Work
| 
|-
| 2000
| "Lucky Me"
| Most Played Australian Work
|

Australian Women in Music Awards
The Australian Women in Music Awards (AWMA) is an annual event that celebrates outstanding women in the Australian Music Industry who have made significant and lasting contributions in their chosen field. They commenced in 2018.

|-
| 2021
| Tania Doko
| Songwriter Award
|

References

APRA Award winners
ARIA Award winners
Victoria (Australia) musical groups
Australian pop music groups
Australian indie rock groups
Musical groups established in 1992
Musical groups disestablished in 2003
Australian musical duos
1992 establishments in Australia
2003 disestablishments in Australia